Malcolm Barrett (born April 22, 1980) is an American actor best known for playing time traveler Rufus Carlin in Timeless on NBC.

Early life and education
Barrett was born and raised in Brooklyn, New York, and graduated from Stuyvesant High School in Manhattan in 1998 with fellow actors Telly Leung and Billy Eichner.

Career
Barrett has appeared as a series regular on Fox's The Sketch Show and Luis.

Barrett played Dr. Lem Hewitt on the ABC television show, Better Off Ted and was a supporting character in the Academy Award-winning The Hurt Locker.

Barrett has had recurring appearances on the New York-based Law & Order franchise. He was featured in an episode of The Sopranos and guest-starred in the pilot episode of It's Always Sunny in Philadelphia, the series finale of The Office as one of Dunder/Mifflin's new employees, and in an episode of Monk as a lottery fanatic. He also had a small role in the movie Larry Crowne, as a classmate of Tom Hanks' character.

From 2016 to 2018, Barrett played the main role of Rufus Carlin in the NBC series Timeless.

Film

Television

References

External links
 
 

1980 births
American male television actors
Living people
Stuyvesant High School alumni
People from Brooklyn
American male film actors
21st-century American male actors
20th-century American male actors
African-American male actors
20th-century African-American people
21st-century African-American people